The Delfino is a concept car built by Alfa Romeo in 1983.

The car was a 2-door coupé designed by Bertone, and was based on the Alfa Romeo Alfa 6 platform. It was presented at the Geneva Motor Show in 1983.

The Delfino had a Busso V6 engine that displaced , and developed  of power at 5600 rpm.

References

External links
 
 
 

Delfino
Bertone concept vehicles
Cars introduced in 1983